Sir William Mordaunt Edward Milner, 5th Baronet (20 June 1820 – 12 February 1867) was a  Whig politician.

Born and baptised in Bolton Percy, Yorkshire, Milner was the son of William Mordaunt Sturt Milner and Harriet Elizabeth née Cavendish-Bentinck, daughter of Lord Edward Bentinck and Elizabeth Cumberland. He married Lady Georgiana Anne Lumley—daughter of Frederick Lumley-Savile and Charlotte Mary Beresford—in 1844, and they had at least seven children: Edith Harriet (1845–1921); Evelyn Selina (–1900); William Mordaunt (1848–1880); Frederick George (1849–1931); Granville Henry (1852–1911); Dudley Francis (1854–1882); and Edward Carolus (1858–1918).

Milner was first elected Whig MP for City of York at a by-election in 1848—caused by the death of Henry Galgacus Redhead Yorke—and held the seat until 1857, when he did not seek re-election.

Milner succeeded to the Baronetcy of Nun Appleton Hall on 24 March 1855 upon the death of William Mordaunt Sturt Milner. Upon his own death in 1867, the title was inherited by William Mordaunt Milner.

References

External links
 

Whig (British political party) MPs for English constituencies
Baronets in the Baronetage of Great Britain
UK MPs 1847–1852
UK MPs 1852–1857
1820 births
1867 deaths
People from Selby District
Politicians from Yorkshire